OHCC may refer to:

Oakland Hills Country Club
Old Hill Cricket Club